Randall Carroll (born April 13, 1991) is a former American football wide receiver and defensive back. He attended the University of California, Los Angeles, having played for the UCLA Bruins from 2009 to 2011, but being dismissed for academic reasons.

High school career
Carroll attended Cathedral High School in Los Angeles, California, where he played running back, cornerback and wide receiver. In his senior year, he totaled 31 catches for 564 yards and four touchdowns, and also carried the ball 73 times for 543 rushing yards and two scores. He was a first-team selection on the 2008 USA Today All-USA team.

Track and field
Also an excellent track athlete, Carroll ran a 10.30 non-wind-aided clocking in the 100 metres at the Del Rey League finals in May 2009. It was the fastest by an American high school sprinter in 2009, and tied Quincy Watts and Riley Washington for the third fastest ever by a California high schooler, behind only Henry Thomas and Ricky Carrigan. In June 2009, he won the CIF state track titles in the 100 (10.38) and 200 (21.08) for the second consecutive year, becoming the first athlete to do so since Charlie Paddock in 1917 and 1918. His achievements earned him a 2009 All-USA track and field team selection by USA Today as well.

Personal bests

College career
Carroll's career at UCLA was filled with turmoil. He was among four players suspended for a game in 2009 for a violation of team rules and caused a stir later that year with a Twitter message disparaging then-offensive coordinator Norm Chow. In 2011, he was among six UCLA players suspended after participating in a benches-clearing brawl October 20 against Arizona. In January 2012, Carroll was dismissed for failing to meet academic requirements. Carroll transferred to Sul Ross State University, where he played his final year of college football.

Professional career

Seattle Seahawks
Carroll signed with the Seattle Seahawks after going unselected in the 2014 NFL Draft. The Seahawks released him on August 1, 2014.

References

External links
New Mexico State Aggies football bio
UCLA Bruins football bio

1991 births
Living people
Players of American football from Los Angeles
American football wide receivers
Track and field athletes from California
UCLA Bruins football players
UCLA Bruins men's track and field athletes
New Mexico State Aggies football players
Seattle Seahawks players
Sportspeople from Irvine, California